Crane Elementary School District may refer to:

Crane Elementary School District (Arizona)
Crane Elementary School District in Crane, Oregon

See also
Crane School (disambiguation)